Rackabones is the sixth studio album by the free improvisation ensemble Biota, released in 1985 by Dys Records. The album marked the official beginning of Biota as an ensemble separate from the Mnemonists name. (The name Mnemonists has continued to be retained for the group's visual output.)

Track listing

Personnel 
Adapted from the Rackabones liner notes.

Biota
 Carol Heineman – instruments, production
 Tom Katsimpalis – instruments, production, illustrations
 Mark Piersel – instruments, production, mixing
 Steve Scholbe – instruments, production, mixing
 William Sharp – instruments, production, mixing
 Randy Yeates – instruments, production

Production and additional personnel
 George Harms – photography
 Carol Heineman – design
 Tom Katsimpalis – illustrations
 Bruce Leek – engineering

Release history

References

External links 
 Rackabones at Discogs (list of releases)

1985 albums
Biota (band) albums